The sack of Rome in 546 was carried out by the Gothic king Totila during the Gothic War of 535–554 between the Ostrogoths and the Eastern Roman Empire. Totila was based at Tivoli and, in pursuit of his quest to reconquer the region of Latium, he moved against Rome. The city endured a siege lasting almost a year before falling to the Goths.

Siege
The siege began in the winter of 545-546. Bessas, the commander of the imperial garrison, had a stock of grain but would only sell it to the civilian population at highly inflated prices. He also refused requests to let civilians leave the city. The contemporary historian Procopius describes the famine during the siege, in which the ordinary Romans, who were not rich enough to buy grain from the military, were reduced to eating bran, nettles, dogs, mice and finally "each other's dung". Some committed suicide. Finally, the imperial commanders "released such of the Romans as desired to depart from the city". He states that many perished on the journey, since they were already enfeebled by famine and many were killed on the road by the enemy.

Pope Vigilius, who had fled to the safety of Syracuse, sent a flotilla of grain ships to feed Rome, but Totila's navy intercepted them near the mouth of the Tiber and captured the fleet. The imperial forces, led by Belisarius, were encamped at Portus awaiting reinforcements. An attempt by them to relieve Rome very nearly succeeded, but failed through the unreliability of subordinate commanders. Belisarius was then taken ill and took no further action.

Fall of Rome
Totila finally entered Rome on 17 December 546, after his men scaled the walls at night and opened the Asinarian Gate. Procopius states that Totila was aided by some Isaurian troops from the imperial garrison who had arranged a secret pact with the Goths. As the Goths cautiously advanced into the city, many of the defenders escaped through another gate; according to Procopius, only 500 were left who sought refuge in various churches; 26 soldiers and 60 civilians were killed. Rome was plundered but Totila – who had apparently intended to turn the city into a sheep pasture – relented. However, he tore down about one third of the defensive walls before leaving in pursuit of Roman forces in Apulia.

Aftermath
After defeating a force left behind by Totila, Belisarius decided to re-occupy Rome in the spring of 547 and hastily rebuilt the demolished sections of wall by piling up the loose stones "one on top of the other, regardless of order" according to Procopius. Totila quickly returned, but was beaten back by the defenders. However, Belisarius did not follow up his advantage. Several cities, including Perugia, were taken by the Goths, while Belisarius remained inactive and then was recalled from Italy. In 549, Totila advanced for a third time against Rome, which he took after another long siege.

See also
Sack of Rome

References

Rome
Gothic War (535–554)
Rome 546
Rome 546
Rome
Night battles
540s in the Byzantine Empire
Military history of Rome
546